Giati Fovase (Greek: Γιατί φοβάσαι; English: Why do you dread) is a Greek-language song performed by Greek recording artist Despina Vandi from her live album Despina Vandi Live. It was released as a promotional cd-single from the album in 2004. The song was recorded from her sold-out live concert in Lycabettus theatre in Athens in 2003.

Original version
The song was first released in 1975 by Demis Roussos, titled "From souvenirs to souvenirs" and had international success. Then Marinella sang it with Greek lyrics by Pythagoras, where it made a huge success in Greece. This version was released on her studio album Marinella Gia Panta, on 30 June 1975 by PolyGram Records.

Track listing

Music video
A music video was filmed for the song and directed by Kostas Kapetanidis. The video includes footage from the live performance of the song in Lycabettus theatre in Athens in 2003.

References

External links
Official site

Marinella songs
Despina Vandi songs
2004 singles
Greek-language songs
Music videos directed by Kostas Kapetanidis
1975 songs
Songs written by Stélios Vlavianós